Villa Villekulla is a fictional house that is the home of Pippi Longstocking, a character in a series of books. She lives there with her horse and monkey, Mr. Nilsson. Outside stands a tree that grows Sockerdricka, a soft drink sold in Sweden.

1969 series and 1970 feature films 
The house used during the TV series and some films with Inger Nilsson in the lead role was located in the locality of Vibble on the island of Gotland in Sweden. Until the 1970s, it stood in a garden at the Gotland Regiment (P 18) south of Visby. It was then relocated to Kneippbyn and Kneippbyns Summerland about three kilometers away from where it stood during filming of Pippi Longstocking, where it remains standing to this day. The garden where the filming took place and where Villa Villekulla stood can still be seen.

Gallery

References

External links 

Kneippbyns summerland

Villekulla
Pippi Longstocking
Fictional buildings and structures originating in literature